Raymond Edward Dorset (born 21 March 1946) is a British guitarist, singer, songwriter, and founder of Mungo Jerry.

He composed most of the songs for the band, including the hit singles "In the Summertime", "Baby Jump", "Lady Rose", "You Don't Have to Be in the Army to Fight in the War", "Long Legged Woman Dressed in Black", and "Hello Nadine", plus "Feels Like I'm in Love", a number one hit single for the Scottish disco singer, Kelly Marie.

Early life
Dorset attended Stanwell Road School (which was renamed Abbotsford County Secondary School) and then Southall Grammar School from the age of 13 after passing the eleven plus exam. He formed The Blue Moon Skiffle Group as a teenager.

He worked as an apprentice hairdresser for nine months after leaving the school without qualifications. After this he studied for a City and Guilds qualification at Twickenham College of Technology and worked for Radio Control Specialists Ltd, National Works, Bath Road, Hounslow, a firm that manufactured Radio Control equipment for models and film work as well as electro-mechanical components.

Music career
In 1968, Dorset formed the group Good Earth, which included Colin Earl on keyboards, Dave Hutchins on bass, and Ray Bowerman on drums. They recorded the album It's Hard Rock And All That on the Saga record label, before Hutchins and Bowerman left. Joe Rush joined on washboard and the group adopted a more acoustic-based skiffle style.

In 1970, with further line-up changes, the group became Mungo Jerry with hits to follow such as "In the Summertime". The song took Dorset only ten minutes to compose on a second-hand Fender Stratocaster while he was taking time off work from his regular job, working in a laboratory for Timex.

Dorset has also maintained a solo career parallel to his leadership of Mungo Jerry. In 1972, he released the album Cold Blue Excursion, made up entirely of self-penned songs, many featuring strings and brass accompaniment. In 1983, he was part of one-off blues outfit Katmandu with Peter Green and Vincent Crane, who recorded an album A Case for the Blues. In 1986, billed as 'Made in England', he recorded and released the theme tune for the TV drama series Prospects, which was also released as a single.

One song recorded by Mungo Jerry, "Feels Like I'm in Love", was originally written by Dorset for Elvis Presley, who died before the song could be recorded. Nevertheless, in 1979 it was recorded by the Scottish disco singer Kelly Marie, and became a UK Number one in September 1980. This made Dorset one of the first songwriters to top the UK Singles Chart with singles performed by himself, and by another musician.

Later disputes
In 2012, Dorset sued his former management company Associated Music International (AMI), run by his former friend and business manager Eliot Cohen, claiming over £2 million in royalties from the song that he believed had been withheld from him. During the course of the proceedings Dorset denied harassing his ex-manager by singing in an "antisemitic" video entitled "Nail that Snail."

In 2017, the High Court ordered Dorset to reimburse AMI a sum of £33,600 that it had paid to Editions Musicales Alpha Sarl (EMA), a French music-publishing company, over misrepresentation of ownership rights to the 1973 song "Alright, Alright, Alright." However, the judge declined to order the payment of lost royalties to AMI.

Personal life
A father of six, Dorset lives with his third wife, Britta, in Bournemouth, Dorset. Interviewed in 2014, Dorset said, "Each of my three marriages has produced two children and I also have three grandchildren. I married my present wife, Britta, in 1995. We sold our home in her native Germany and moved completely to Bournemouth, where we’ve been based since 1994 and own two houses and a restaurant. I should be retired, but my brain is like that of an 18-year-old."

Dorset is a Freemason and a member of Chelsea Lodge No. 3098. Dorset can be seen performing "In the Summertime" in the 5-part documentary "Inside the Freemasons," produced by the BBC in 2017.

In 2016, Dorset said that he had suffered from irritable bowel syndrome for over 45 years, partly blaming the "rock 'n' roll lifestyle" that he enjoyed after the success of "In the Summertime".

In June 2021 Dorset said, during an interview with radio and TV presenter Mike Read, that he had recovered from open-heart surgery. He added that he no longer had his trademark sideburns, because they had been difficult to manage in hospital, and that although all his hair was real, he dyed it.

References

External links

 Official Mungo Jerry Site

 

1946 births
Living people
English male singer-songwriters
English rock guitarists
English male guitarists
English Freemasons
Blues harmonica players
People from Ashford, Surrey
Mungo Jerry members
Katmandu (band) members